Charaxes chepalunga is a butterfly in the family Nymphalidae. It is found in south- south-eastern Kenya and north-western Tanzania. The habitat consists of evergreen and riverine forests.

The larvae feed on Scutia myrtina.

Taxonomy
Charaxes chepalunga is a member of the large species group Charaxes etheocles

References

Victor Gurney Logan Van Someren, 1969 Revisional notes on African Charaxes (Lepidoptera: Nymphalidae). Part V. Bulletin of the British Museum (Natural History) (Entomology)75-166.

External links
African Charaxes/ Charaxes Africains Eric Vingerhoedt chepalungu species page and images 
Images at Bold 
African Butterfly Database Range map via search

Butterflies described in 1969
chepalunga